Friday Night with Jonathan Ross is a British chat show which was broadcast on BBC One from 2 November 2001 to 16 July 2010. 275 episodes were shown throughout the course of eighteen series.

Series

Episodes

Series 1 (2001)

Series 2 (2002)

Series 3 (2002)

Series 4 (2003)

Series 5 (2003)

Series 6 (2004)

Series 7 (2004)

Series 8 (2005)

Series 9 (2005)

Series 10 (2006)

Series 11 (2006)

Series 12 (2007)

Series 13 (2007)

Series 14 (2008)

Series 15 (2008)

Series 16 (2009)

Series 17 (2009)

Series 18 (2010)

References

External links
 
 

Friday Night with Jonathan Ross
Lists of British non-fiction television series episodes